Tofte is a surname of Norwegian origin which may refer to:

People
 Andreas Tofte (1794–1851), Norwegian businessman and Mayor of Oslo
 Arthur Tofte (1902–1980), American science fiction and fantasy author
 Britt Pettersen Tofte (born 1961), Norwegian cross country skier
 Jørg Tofte Jebsen (1888–1922), Norwegian physicist
 Jørgen Tofte Nielsen (born 1971), Danish former football goalkeeper
 Lars Løberg Tofte, Norwegian musician with rock band Heroes & Zeros
 Mads Tofte (born 1959), Danish computer scientist
 Robert Tofte (1562–1620), English translator and poet
 Tracy Tofte (Tracy Wells, born 1971), American actress
 Valdemar Tofte (1832–1907), Danish violinist and teacher
 Ørnulf Tofte (born 1922), Norwegian police officer

Places
 Tofte, Norway, village in the municipality of Asker, Norway
Södra Cell Tofte, a pulp mill located in Tofte, Norway
 Tofte Township, Cook County, Minnesota, an American township
 Tofte, Minnesota, an unincorporated community in Tofte Township
 Tofte Glacier, on Peter I Island near Antarctica

See also 
 Toft (disambiguation)
 Tuft (disambiguation)
 Tufte, surname

Danish-language surnames
Norwegian-language surnames